Benjamín Moreno Márquez (17 April 1955 – 1 May 2020) was a Spanish footballer who played as striker.

Career
Born in Guarromán, his family emigrated to Madrid. He started playing football in Murcia and Valdepeñas. In 1980 he joined CD Leganés, then in Tercera División where he spent his best years (1980–1985). In five seasons he played 168 matches and scored 52 goals. He was the first legend of modern football in CD Leganés.

After leaving that club, he played in CD Móstoles, CF Fuenlabrada and CD Sonseca.

He worked in Metro de Madrid, where he retired. Benjamín died on 1 May 2020 in Madrid.

He is considered the first legend of modern CD Leganés.

References

External links
 Moreno in bdfútbol

1955 births
2020 deaths
Footballers from Jaén, Spain
Tercera División players
Spanish footballers
Footballers from Extremadura
CD Leganés players
Association football forwards